Televised Morality: The Case of "Buffy the Vampire Slayer" is a 2004 academic publication relating to the fictional Buffyverse established by TV series, Buffy and Angel.

Book description

The increasing frequency of moralist critiques of television shows is an acknowledgment of television's growing role in the shaping of a culture's moral values. Yet many moralist critiques misconstrue the full moral message of a show due to a restrictive focus on sex, violence, and profanity. Televised Morality explores the nature of moral discourse on television by using Buffy the Vampire Slayer as a case study.

Contents

External links
whedonstudies.tv - Chapter from this book

Books about the Buffyverse
2004 non-fiction books